Methylornithine may refer to:

 3-Methylornithine
 N-Methylornithine